Jairo Gabriel Molina Ospino (born April 28, 1993) is a Colombian footballer who plays for Deportivo Pereira as a forward.

References

External links

1993 births
Living people
Colombian footballers
Colombian expatriate footballers
Categoría Primera B players
Categoría Primera A players
Ascenso MX players
Envigado F.C. players
Bogotá FC footballers
Deportes Tolima footballers
Dorados de Sinaloa footballers
Deportivo Pasto footballers
Deportivo Pereira footballers
Expatriate footballers in Mexico
Colombian expatriate sportspeople in Mexico
Association football forwards
People from Atlántico Department
21st-century Colombian people